Moses Hart (1675–1756) was a Prussian-born English merchant, financier, and philanthropist. Along with his brother, Chief Rabbi Aaron Hart, he was one of the founders of the Ashkenazic Jewish community of England.

During the high-treasurership of Lord Godolphin in the reign of Queen Anne, a government appointment was conferred upon Hart, and thereby he attained to great affluence. In 1722, motivated by religious zeal and by the fact that the London Jewish community had outgrown its temporary house of prayer, Hart contributed a large sum to cover the cost of erecting a permanent building. This was the first building of the Great Synagogue of London; it was inaugurated on New Year's Eve, 1722. In the same year he was recognised as a resident of Great Britain, after he received letters of denization. He and his brother would become involved in petitioning help for Jews across Europe, petitioning the king to intervene the expulsion of Jewish expulsion from Prague which the government did in 1744. Hart was also part of the campaign to pass the Jewish Naturalisation Act 1753. 

Hart married Prudence Heilbruth with who he had six children, among them Judith Levy, the philanthropist. He died on 19 November 1756 and was buried in Alderney Road cemetery.

References
 

1675 births
1756 deaths
17th-century Prussian people
Businesspeople from Wrocław
English financial businesspeople
English Jews
English merchants
English people of German-Jewish descent
German emigrants to the Kingdom of Great Britain
Philanthropists from London